Elections to the Orkney Islands Council were held on 6 May 1999 as part of Scottish local elections. Only independent candidates contested the election. Eight seats were uncontested.

Election results

Ward results

References

Orkney
Orkney Islands Council elections